Account sharing, also known as credential sharing is the process of sharing login information with multiple users to access online accounts or services.  This can include sharing informations like E-mail addresses, usernames and passwords for social media accounts, subscription services, gaming platforms or other online services.

Reasons for account sharing 
Account sharing is a common practice, especially among younger users who may not have the financial resources to pay for multiple accounts or subscriptions. It is also commonly used among families or groups of friends who want to access a shared account or service. Another reason could be to gain special features that depends on a single account like special items in a game account.

Reasons against account sharing

Rule Violation and Restrictions 
Account sharing can also present several risks and challenges. For example, it can violate the terms of service of many online accounts, which often prohibit users from sharing their login credentials with others. This can result in account suspensions or even termination, and can cause users to lose access to important data or services. On the other hand account sharing can lose money for the service the account is being shared for.  Google prohibits the practice, along with Facebook

Security Risks 
In addition, account sharing can also pose security risks, as it can make it easier for hackers to gain access to multiple accounts using a single set of login credentials. This can lead to sensitive data being compromised or accounts being taken over by unauthorized users. The person the information is shared with could act careless and not secure enough with the login datas or could steal the informations for other purposes as a social engineering-strategy.

Prevention 
Some services offer combined accounts, such as multiple family accounts (Family Sharing) with special child safety options or software license for multiple company accounts to a cheaper prize to prevent account sharing. Another system to make account sharing more difficult is the Multi-factor authentication which often requires the sharer to instantly share the information on their device with the receiver.

Netflix 
In 2022, Netflix limited where accounts could be used, based on IP addresses. Their terms of service state that "personal and non-commercial use only and may not be shared with individuals beyond your household". The company later released paid options for account sharing, and is expected to remove free account sharing in 2023.

Legality

In the United Kingdom, sharing passwords for certain services, such as streaming services, without authorization is considered copyright infringement.

References 

Identity management
Internet fraud